The Tacna–Arica compromise or Treaty of Lima was a series of documents that settled the territorial dispute of both Tacna and Arica provinces of Peru and Chile respectively. According to the Treaty, the Tacna-Arica Territory was divided between both countries; Tacna being awarded to Peru and with Chile retaining sovereignty over Arica. Chile also agreed to pay up to 6 million dollars in compensation to Peru. The Treaty was signed on June 3, 1929, in the city of Lima by then Peruvian Representative Pedro José Rada y Gamio and Chilean Representative Emiliano Figueroa Larrain.

Background

The controversy was a direct aftermath of the War of the Pacific, a confrontation that involved Chile against Peru and Bolivia. Chile won the war and conquered the Peruvian territories of Tarapacá, Tacna and Arica. The defeated Peruvian government was forced to sign the Treaty of Ancón in 1883.

According to this treaty, Tarapacá was annexed to Chile, and a plebiscite was meant to take place in 1893, 10 years after the signing of the treaty. The plebiscite, however, never took place, as both countries had conflicting points of view and did not reach an agreement. Chile then began a campaign known as Chilenization in 1909. Peru followed in 1911 with the recalling of its ambassador and a break of diplomatic relations.

In 1922, Chile and Peru agreed to arbitrate the dispute with the President of the United States. US President Calvin Coolidge appointed, in 1925, the first US arbitrator, General John J. Pershing; General William Lassiter followed in 1926. Neither negotiator was able to break the deadlock. US Secretary of State Frank B. Kellogg suggested direct negotiations in Washington, D.C. in 1928. It was these negotiations that led to the Treaty of Lima.

Treaty
The deal that was finally reached allowed Peru to reacquire Tacna while Chile kept Arica. Chile had also to make some concessions such as building a Peruvian-administered wharf in Arica and pay a six million-dollar indemnification, among other provisions. In 1999, Chile and Peru at last agreed to fully implement the Treaty of Lima, providing Peru with access to port facilities in Arica.

Notes

References

 Coolidge, Calvin (1925) In the matter of the arbitration between the Republic of Chile and the Republic of Peru, with respect to the unfulfilled provisions of the treaty of peace of October 20, 1883, under the Protocol and Supplementary act signed at Washington July 20, 1922. Opinion and award of the arbitrator Government Printing Office, Washington, D.C., 
 Dennis, William Jefferson (1931) Tacna and Arica: an account of the Chile-Peru boundary dispute and of the arbitrations by the United States Yale University Press, New Haven, ; reprinted in 1967 by Archon Books, Hamden, Connecticut, 
 Egaña, Rafael (1900) The Tacna and Arica question. Historical antecedents.--Diplomatic action. Present state of the affair (translated from the Spanish edition by Edwin C. Reed) Barcelona Printing Office, Santiago, Chile, 
 González Miranda, Sergio (2006) Arica y la triple frontera: integración y conflicto entre Bolivia, Perú y Chile Aríbalo, Iquique, Chile, in Spanish
 Jane, Lionel Cecil (1930) "The question of Tacna-Arica ..." Transactions of the Grotius Society 15: pp. 93–119
 Krieg, William L. (1974) Legacy of the War of the Pacific External Research Program, United States Department of State, Washington, D.C., 
 Skuban, William E. (2007) Lines in the sand: nationalism and identity on the Peruvian-Chilean frontier University of New Mexico Press, Albuquerque, New Mexico, 
 Wilson, Joe F. (1979) The United States, Chile and Peru in the Tacna and Arica plebiscite University Press of America, Washington, D.C., 
 Yepes, Ernesto (1999) Un plebiscito imposible: Tacna y Arica, 1925-1926 Ediciones Análisis, Lima, Peru, in Spanish

Arbitration cases
Chile–Peru relations
Territorial disputes of Peru
Territorial disputes of Chile
Lima (1929)
History of the foreign relations of Chile
History of Peru
Presidential Republic (1925–1973)
War of the Pacific
1929 in Chile
1929 in Peru
Lima (1929)
1920s in Lima
Chile–Peru border
Lima (1929)

pt:Tratado de Lima